This is a list of Pakistani films released in 2017. Punjab Nahi Jaungi was the highest grossing Pakistani film released on Eid-ul-Azha in 2017. However, it was replaced by Jawani Phir Nahi Ani 2 which was released on Eid-ul-Azha 2018.

Highest grossing films

The top 10 films released in 2017 by worldwide gross are as follows:

Background color  indicates the current releases

Events

Award ceremonies

Film festivals

Releases

January – April

May – August

September – December

See also
 List of highest-grossing Pakistani films
 List of highest-grossing films in Pakistan
 List of Pakistani films of 2018

References

2017 Pakistani film industry kay liye kuch acha nai raha

External links
The History of Lollywood Decade By Decade (1947—Present)

2017
Lists of 2017 films by country or language
Films